Sing! Sing! Sing! is an album by jazz guitarist John Pizzarelli that was released in 1987.

Track listing

Personnel
 John Pizzarelli – guitar, vocals
 Eddie Daniels – tenor saxophone, clarinet
 Ken Levinsky – piano, synthesizer
 Bucky Pizzarelli – guitar
 Gary Haase – double bass
 Steve Ferrera – drums
 Amanda Homi – vocals

References

1987 albums
John Pizzarelli albums
Albums produced by Bernard Brightman
P-Vine Records albums